Coco is an unincorporated community in Kanawha County, West Virginia, United States.

The community was originally named Poco, after the name of a rooster in a story, but the spelling was changed in processing by the postal service. Prior to being named "Coco", the community was known as "Elklick", a name that likely started because of the region's elk population. Coco, West Virginia is also home to a cemetery named "Coco Cemetery." It is home to 19 memorials.

References 

Unincorporated communities in West Virginia
Unincorporated communities in Kanawha County, West Virginia